The Deal was an automobile manufactured at the J.J. Deal and Son Carriage Factory in Jonesville, Michigan from 1905 to 1911. The vehicle was a small four-seater motor buggy that had solid rubber tires.

References
 

Defunct motor vehicle manufacturers of the United States
Motor vehicle manufacturers based in Michigan
Hillsdale County, Michigan
Defunct manufacturing companies based in Michigan